Khorasani may refer to:

People 
 Abu Muslim Khorasani
 Mohammad-Kazem Khorasani
 Noushin Ahmadi Khorasani
 Mohammad Va'ez Abaee-Khorasani
 Sultan Ali Khorasani
 Hossein Waheed Khorasani

Places
 Khorasani, Fars, a village in Fars Province, Iran

See also 
 Khorasan (disambiguation)
 Khorasani Turkic language
 Greater Khorasan
 Khorasan Province
 Khorasani style, a medieval architectural style
 Khorasani style (poetry), a medieval Persian poetic style